Annular erythema of infancy is a skin condition reported in children roughly six months in age, characterized by transitory skin lesions that resolved without treatment within eleven months.

See also 
 List of cutaneous conditions

References

Eosinophilic cutaneous conditions